Chester is a surname of English origin. Its Romance (Italian, Portuguese, Spanish, and Galician) equivalent is Castro. 

Notable people with the surname include:

 Albert Chester (1886–1943), English footballer
 Art Chester (1899–1949), American air racer
 Bob Chester (1908–1977), American jazz and pop music bandleader and tenor saxophonist.
 Charlie Chester (1914–1997), British stand-up comedian
 Craig Chester (born 1965), American actor and screenwriter
 Darren Chester (born 1967), Australian politician
 Elroy Chester (1969–2013), American murderer
 Frank Chester (politician) (1901–1966), Canadian politician
 Frank Chester (umpire) (1895–1957), English first-class cricketer and notable international cricket umpire
 Gary Chester (1924–1987), American session drummer and drum teacher
 George Randolph Chester (1869–1924), American writer and screenwriter 
 Major F. G. L. Chester (1899–1946), also known as Gort Chester, British soldier and member of Z Special Unit in Borneo
 Harry Chester (1806–1868), British civil servant 
 Ilan Chester (born 1952), Venezuelan singer, keyboardist, arranger and composer; he was born in Israel as Ilan Czenstochowski
 James Chester (born 1989), Welsh footballer who plays for Hull City
 John Chester (disambiguation), several people
 Joseph Lemuel Chester, American genealogist
 Norman Chester (1907–86), British political economist associated with Nuffield College, Oxford
 Peter Chester, English convicted murderer and paedophile
 Peter Chester (governor), Governor of West Florida between August 10, 1770 and May 9, 1781
 Raymond Chester (born 1948), retired American football tight end
 Robert Chester (disambiguation), multiple people
 William Chester (disambiguation), multiple people

English toponymic surnames